Robinson's banded langur (Presbytis robinsoni), also known as Robinson's banded surili, is a species of monkey in the family Cercopithecidae.  It was formerly considered a subspecies of the Raffles' banded langur Presbytis femoralis, but genetic analysis revealed that it is no more related to Raffles' banded langur than it is to several other Presbytis species.  It lives in the northern Malay Peninsula, including southern Burma and Thailand.  It is listed as near threatened by the IUCN.

References

Presbytis
Mammals of Malaysia
Mammals of Myanmar
Mammals of Thailand
Taxa named by Oldfield Thomas
Primates of Southeast Asia
Mammals described in 1910
Near threatened biota of Asia
Taxobox binomials not recognized by IUCN